Massachusetts Route 18 is a  north–south state highway in Southeastern Massachusetts.

Route description

Route 18 starts as a four-lane freeway, a continuation of John F. Kennedy Memorial Highway in downtown New Bedford, at U.S. Route 6. After the intersection with I-195, Route 18 runs via surface streets parallel to Route 140 for a while, up to a connector road with Route 140 northbound. (Before its highway route was constructed, Route 140 followed County Road from Taunton until terminating at Route 18 in Freetown near the New Bedford line.) Route 18 then continues on a generally northerly direction. The highway goes through the East Freetown section of Freetown, Lakeville (with a three-mile (5 km) concurrency with Route 105 along Assawompset Pond), Middleborough, where the highway meets U.S. Route 44 and Route 28 at the Middleboro rotary just north of Interstate 495, beginning a six-mile (10 km) concurrency with Route 28 until the center of Bridgewater, East Bridgewater, Whitman, Abington, and Weymouth, ending at Route 53.

History
The current routing of Route 18 was established in 1933 taking over what was the routing of Route 102 from Weymouth to Route 28 in Bridgewater (the remainder to Route 140 in Taunton became part of Route 104) running concurrently with Route 28 from Bridgewater to Middleboro, taking a new highway constructed in 1932 from Middleboro to Lakeville, running concurrently with Route 105 for a short distance before turning southwest and taking a route to end at Route 140 in Freetown. Around 1968 Route 18 arrived at its current terminus when extended further south along a highway parallel to Route 140 to end at U.S. 6. When first established in 1927, Route 18 ran on a different alignment from Route 123 in Rockland north to Route 3A in Hingham using Hingham Street in Rockland; Pond Street in Norwell; and Main, Short, Leavitt and East Streets in Hingham. In 1931 the Hingham portion became part of the circumferential Route 128 and the remaining parts in Norwell and Rockland had the Route 18 designation removed in 1932.

Highway improvements
A major fault of Route 18 north of Bridgewater is its intersection patterns. At all lights north of Bridgewater center, the road widens to four lanes temporarily, before and after the intersection. While this helps alleviate backups at the lights and assists vehicles turning left off of the route, it creates bottlenecks after the intersection, where the two lanes re-merge into one. To improve this, the Massachusetts Department of Transportation's Highway Division will be widening the section of Route 18 from Highland Place in Weymouth to Route 139 in Abington from two to four lanes. The $26 million project was originally planned to begin in 2013, but had yet to break ground as of July 2014. The project was substantially completed in late 2022 with the dedication of the rebuilt bridge over the MBTA commuter honoring fallen Weymouth Police officer, Michael C. Chesna.

Major intersections

References

 John F. Kennedy Memorial Highway (Downtown Connector) on Bostonroads.com

018
Abington, Massachusetts
New Bedford, Massachusetts
Freetown, Massachusetts
Lakeville, Massachusetts
Middleborough, Massachusetts
Bridgewater, Massachusetts
East Bridgewater, Massachusetts
Whitman, Massachusetts
Weymouth, Massachusetts
Transportation in Bristol County, Massachusetts
Transportation in Norfolk County, Massachusetts
Transportation in Plymouth County, Massachusetts